Anton Moortgat (21 September 1897 in Antwerp – 9 October 1977 in Damme Belgium) was a Belgian archaeologist. He was the first full professor for the archaeology of the ancient near east in Germany.

Biography 

He studied archaeology, classics and ancient history and got his PhD in 1923 under Ferdinand Noack. He worked as a research assistant at the Max Freiherr von Oppenheim-Stiftung in Berlin, and since 1929 in the Ancient Near East department of the National Museums in Berlin.

In 1948 he became a professor at the Free University of Berlin.

In 1955 he had done excavations in Syria.

In 2007 The Museum of the Ancient Near East has dedicated a memorial exhibition to Moortgat, marking the 110th anniversary of his birthday .

References 

1897 births
1977 deaths
Belgian archaeologists
Academic staff of the Humboldt University of Berlin
People from Antwerp
20th-century archaeologists